is a station on the Odawara Line of the Odakyu Electric Railway, located in Kitazawa, Setagaya, Tokyo.

History
Higashi-Kitazawa Station opened with the line on 1 April 1927. Until 1966, it served freight as well as passengers.

On 1 October 2005, the express tracks through the station were taken out of service, in order to enable work to grade-separate the line and provide continuous quadruple track through Setagaya Ward. The station was moved underground on 23 March 2013, and a new station building opened on 16 May 2015.

Station numbering was introduced in 2014 with Yoyogi-Hachiman being assigned station number OH06.

Station Layout

The station currently consists of one underground island platform and four tracks. Express trains typically utilize the outer (express) tracks, bypassing the station, while local trains usually stop at the station on the inner (local) tracks.

Track 1 is for trains towards Odawara and Katase-Enoshima, Track 2 for trains towards Shinjuku and the Chiyoda Line.

Until 2005, the station consisted of two side platforms and four tracks, with the inner two used by non-stop trains.

Services

Trains serve this station 0455-0105 every day.

Only local trains stop at this station. The current off-peak service consists of 6 trains per hour to Shinjuku and 6 trains per hour to Hon-Atsugi. Typical journey times are 9 minutes to Shinjuku and 1 hour 20 minutes to Hon-Atsugi (though if passengers change at Shimo-Kitazawa to a Rapid Express, they can reach the latter in as little as 45 minutes). There are no direct services to the Chiyoda Line from this station; passengers must instead change at Yoyogi-Uehara.

References

Odakyu Odawara Line
Stations of Odakyu Electric Railway
Railway stations in Tokyo
Railway stations in Japan opened in 1927